Hristiyan Iliev (born 31 March 1998) is a Bulgarian footballer who currently plays as a midfielder for Kariana on loan from Montana.

Career 
Iliev bеgan his career in Montana. On 14 May 2016 he made his debut for the team in A Group in a match against Lokomotiv Plovdiv.

On 1 July 2018, Iliev was loaned to Kariana.

Career statistics

Club

References

External links
 

Living people
1998 births
Bulgarian footballers
Association football midfielders
FC Montana players
FC Kariana Erden players
First Professional Football League (Bulgaria) players
Second Professional Football League (Bulgaria) players